The Alma Historic District is located in Alma, Wisconsin.

Description
The district is a large one featuring over 100 contributing properties squeezed between the river and the bluffs, many built during the booming Beef Slough logging days from 1867 to 1889.

References

Historic districts on the National Register of Historic Places in Wisconsin
National Register of Historic Places in Buffalo County, Wisconsin